Smarch may refer to:

People
Carl Smarch, a candidate in the 1989 Yukon general election
Jim Smarch, a candidate in the 1992 Yukon general election
Keith Wolfe Smarch, a Tlingit people woodcarver and apprentice of Dempsey Bob

Fiction
A fictional month name (possibly indicating the thirteenth) in The Simpsons episode "Treehouse of Horror VI"